The 2021 Rugby League World Cup Group A may refer to:
 2021 Men's Rugby League World Cup Group A
 2021 Women's Rugby League World Cup Group A
 2021 Wheelchair Rugby League World Cup Group A
 2021 Physical Disability Rugby League World Cup group stage

See also 
 2021 Rugby League World Cup (disambiguation)